The 55th Cannes Film Festival started on 15 May and ran until 26 May 2002. The Palme d'Or went to the Polish-French-German-British co-produced film The Pianist directed by Roman Polanski.

The festival opened with Hollywood Ending, directed by Woody Allen and closed with And Now... Ladies and Gentlemen, directed by Claude Lelouch. Virginie Ledoyen was the mistress of ceremonies.

Director Woody Allen was also presented with the inaugural Honorary Palme d'Or given to a director who had achieved a notable body of work but who had never won a competitive Palme d'Or.

Juries

Main competition
The following people were appointed as the Jury for the feature films of the 2002 Official Selection:
 David Lynch, Jury President
 Sharon Stone
 Michelle Yeoh
 Christine Hakim
 Régis Wargnier
 Bille August
 Raúl Ruiz
 Claude Miller
 Walter Salles

Un Certain Regard
The following people were appointed as the Jury of the 2002 Un Certain Regard:
 Anne Fontaine (director) President
 David Tran (critic)
 Fabienne Bradfer (critic)
 Fabrice Pliskin (critic)
 Jean-Sébastien Chauvin (critic)
 Louis Guichard (critic)
 Pierre Vavasseur (critic)

Cinéfondation and short films
The following people were appointed as the Jury of the Cinéfondation and short films competition:
 Martin Scorsese (director) President
 Abbas Kiarostami (director)
 Jan Schutte (director)
 Judith Godrèche (actress)
 Tilda Swinton (actress)

Camera d'Or
The following people were appointed as the Jury of the 2002 Camera d'Or:
 Géraldine Chaplin (actress) President
 Bahman Ghobadi (director)
 Marthe Keller (actress)
 Murali Nair (director)
 Romain Goupil (director)

Official selection

In competition - Feature film
The following feature films competed for the Palme d'Or:

 24 Hour Party People by Michael Winterbottom
 About Schmidt by Alexander Payne
 The Adversary (L'Adversaire) by Nicole Garcia
 All or Nothing by Mike Leigh
 Bowling for Columbine by Michael Moore
 Chi-hwa-seon by Im Kwon-taek
 Demonlover by Olivier Assayas
 Divine Intervention (Yadon ilaheyya) by Elia Suleiman
 Irréversible by Gaspar Noé
 Kedma by Amos Gitai
 Marie-Jo and Her Two Lovers (Marie-Jo et ses deux amours) by Robert Guédiguian
 The Man Without a Past (Mies vailla menneisyyttä) by Aki Kaurismäki
 My Mother's Smile (L'ora di religione) by Marco Bellocchio
 The Pianist by Roman Polanski
 Punch-Drunk Love by Paul Thomas Anderson
 Russian Ark (Russkiy kovcheg) by Alexander Sokurov
 The Son (Le Fils) by Dardenne brothers
 Spider by David Cronenberg
 Sweet Sixteen by Ken Loach
 Ten by Abbas Kiarostami
 The Uncertainty Principle (O Princípio da Incerteza) by Manoel de Oliveira
 Unknown Pleasures (Ren Xiao Yao) by Jia Zhangke

Un Certain Regard
The following films were selected for the competition of Un Certain Regard:

 Angel on the Right (Fararishtay kifti rost) by Jamshed Usmonov
 Balzac and the Little Chinese Seamstress (Balzac et la Petite Tailleuse Chinoise) by Dai Sijie
 Blissfully Yours (Sud sanaeha) by Apichatpong Weerasethakul
 The Box of Life (Sunduq al-dunyâ) by Usama Muhammad
 El Bonaerense by Pablo Trapero
 Carnages by Delphine Gleize
 The Confession (Itiraf) by Zeki Demirkubuz
 Cry Woman (Ku Qi De Nü Ren) by Liu Bingjian
 Double Vision (Shuang tong) by Chen Kuo-fu
 Fate (Yazgi) by Zeki Demirkubuz
 Glowing Eyes (La chatte à deux têtes) by Jacques Nolot
 Long Way Home by Peter Sollett
 Madame Satã by Karim Aïnouz
 Marooned in Iraq (Avazhayé Sarzaminé Madariyam) by Bahman Ghobadi
 A Piece of Sky (Une part du ciel) by Bénédicte Liénard
 Rachida by Yamina Bachir
 Seventeen Times Cecile Cassard (17 fois Cécile Cassard) by Christophe Honoré
 Ten Minutes Older by Spike Lee, Aki Kaurismäki, Chen Kaige, Jim Jarmusch, Werner Herzog, Víctor Erice, Wim Wenders
 Terra incognita by Ghassan Salhab
 To Stay Alive (Bemani) by Dariush Mehrjui
 Tomorrow La Scala! by Francesca Joseph
 Waiting for Happiness (Heremakono) by Abderrahmane Sissako

Films out of competition
The following films were selected to be screened out of competition:

 16 December by Mani Shankar
 And Now... Ladies and Gentlemen by Claude Lelouch
 Ararat by Atom Egoyan
 Carlo Giuliani, Boy (Carlo Giuliani, ragazzo) by Francesca Comencini
 City of God (Cidade de Deus) by Fernando Meirelles
 Devdas by Sanjay Leela Bhansali
 Femme Fatale by Brian De Palma
 From the Other Side (De l'autre côté) by Chantal Akerman
 Histoires de festival by Gilles Jacob
 Hollywood Ending by Woody Allen
 The Kid Stays in the Picture by Brett Morgen, Nanette Burstein
 The Last Letter (La dernière lettre) by Frederick Wiseman
 Murder by Numbers by Barbet Schroeder
 Searching for Debra Winger by Rosanna Arquette
 Spirit: Stallion of the Cimarron by Kelly Asbury, Lorna Cook
 Star Wars: Attack of the Clones by George Lucas
 To Be and to Have (Être et avoir) by Nicolas Philibert
 Women in the Mirror (Kagami no onnatachi) by Yoshishige Yoshida

Cinéfondation
The following short films were selected for the competition of Cinéfondation:

 17 minute intarziere by Catalin Mitulescu (Romania)
 Chogyeoul Jumshim by Byung-Hwa Kang (South Korea)
 Honey Moon by Sung-Jin Park (South Korea)
 K-G I Nod Och Lust by Jens Jonsson (Sweden)
 Khoj by Tridib Poddar (India)
 La derniere journee d'Alfred Maassen by David Lammers (Netherlands)
 La mort en exil by Ayten Mutlu Saray (Switzerland)
 P.S. by Arni Asgeirsson (Poland)
 Um Sol Alaranjado by Eduardo Valente (Brazil)
 Questions d'un ouvrier mort by Aya Somech (Israel)
 Request by Jinoh Park (South Korea)
 Seule maman a les yeux bleus by Eric Forestier (France)
 Shearing by Eicke Bettinga (United Kingdom)
 Soshuu no neko by Masaaki Uchida (Japan)
 The Look Of Happiness by Marianela Maldonado (United Kingdom)
 Vals by Edgar Bartenev (Russia)

Short film competition
The following short films competed for the Short Film Palme d'Or:

 A Very Very Silent Film by Manish Jha
 After Rain (Esö után) by Péter Mészáros
 Daughter by Eduardo Rodríguez
 Le chaperon noir by Yannis Yapanis
 Retenir son souffle by Anthony Lucas
 Speel Met Me by Esther Rots
 Tai Tai by Nicholas Chin
 Tango de l'oubli by Alexis Mital Toledo
 The Stone of Folly by Jesse Rosensweet
 Vol 404 by Bruce Terris
 Yoake a Chewing-Gum Story by Roland Zumbühl

Parallel sections

International Critics' Week
The following films were screened for the 41st International Critics' Week (41e Semaine de la Critique):

Feature film competition

 Respiro by Emanuele Crialese (Italy)
 Filles perdues, cheveux gras by Claude Duty (France)
 Rana’s Wedding by Hany Abu-Assad (Palestine)
 Too Young To Die (Jukeodo joha) by Park Jin-pyo (South Korea)
 Les Fils de Marie by Carole Laure (Canada - France)
 Kabala by Assane Kouyaté (Mali/France)
 Chicken Heart by Hiroshi Shimizu (Japan)

Short film competition

 Le Jour où je suis né by Kunitoshi Manda (Japan)
 Lettre au fils by Philippe Welsh (France)
 Malcom by Baker Karim (Sweden)
 Meeting Evil (Möte med ondskan) by Reza Parsa (Sweden)
 2 Minutes (2 Minutter) by Jacob Tschernia (Denmark)
 Le Vigile by Frédéric Pelle (France)
 From Mesmer, with Love or Tea for Two (De Mesmer, con amor o Té para dos) by Salvador Lubezki & Alejandro Lubezki (Mexico)

Special screenings

 Intacto by Juan Carlos Fresnadillo (Spain) (opening film)
 More by Barbet Schroeder (Luxembourg) (La séance du Parrain)
 Bella Ciao by Roberto Torelli, Marco Giusti (Italy) (Documentary)
 Intimisto by Licia Eminenti (France) (Prix de la Critique) 
 Anxiety by Christoffer Boe (Denmark) (Prix de la Critique)
 Da Zero a Dieci (From Zero to Ten) by Luciano Ligabue (Italy) (closing film)

Directors' Fortnight
The following films were screened for the 2002 Directors' Fortnight (Quinzaine des Réalizateurs): 

 Abouna by Mahamat-Saleh Haroun (Chad, France)
 Angela by Roberta Torre (Italy)
 Apartment 5C by Raphaël Nadjari (France, Israel, United States)
 Blue Gate Crossing by Chih-yen Yee (Taiwan, France)
 Bord de mer by Julie Lopes-Curval (France)
 The Embalmer (L'imbalsamatore) by Matteo Garrone (Italy)
 Ingmar Bergman: Intermezzo (doc.) by Gunnar Bergdahl (Sweden)
 István Bibó, fragments by Péter Forgács (Hungary)
 Japón by Carlos Reygadas (Mexico, Spain, Germany)
 Matir Moina (The Clay Bird) by Tareque Masud (France, Bangladesh)
 Laurel Canyon by Lisa Cholodenko (United States)
 Morvern Callar by Lynne Ramsay (United Kingdom)
 Monrak Transistor by Pen-ek Ratanaruang (Thailand)
 Nada+ by Juan Carlos Cremata Malberti (Cuba, France, Spain, Italy)
 Occident by Cristian Mungiu (Romania)
 Once Upon a Time in the Midlands by Shane Meadows (United Kingdom, Germany)
 Only the Strong Survive (doc.) by D.A. Pennebaker, Chris Hegedus (United States)
 Un oso rojo by Israel Adrián Caetano (Argentina, France, Spain)
 Otello di Carmelo Bene by Carmelo Bene (Italy)
 Le pays du chien qui chante by Yann Dedet (France)
 Sex Is Comedy by Catherine Breillat (France)
 Two (Deux) by Werner Schroeter (France, Germany)
 Une pure coïncidence by Romain Goupil (France)
 Welcome to Collinwood by Joseph and Anthony Russo (United States)

Short films

 A-20 by Geoff Hughes, Brad Warren (United States)
 Après l’enfance by Thomas Lilti (France)
 Bang Nhau… Egaux by Stéfan Sao Nélet (France)
 Bob the slob by Nate Theis (United States)
 Bus 44 by Dayyan Eng (Hong Kong, United States)
 L’Arrivée by Peter Tscherkassky (Austria)
 Comme ça j’entends la mer by Hélène Milano (France)
 Comme un seul homme by Jean-Louis Gonnet (France)
 Deux cents dirham] by Laila Marrakchi (France, Morocco)
 Entering indifference by Vincent Dieutre (France)
 Fish in the Sea is Not Thirsty by Soopum Sohn (South Korea, United States)
 Insomniac by Matt Woo], Vanja Varasac (United States)
 La Vie sur un fil by Steven Lippman (United States)
 Mémoires incertaines by Michale Boganim (France, United Kingdom)
 Mexicano by Toby McDonald (United Kingdom)
 Muno by Bouli Lanners (Belgium)
 Next Door by Jeff Rich (United States)
 Présent inachevé by Johan Van der Keuken (Netherlands)
 Phantom by Matthias Müller (Germany)
 Portraits filmés 2002 by Valérie Mréjen (France)
 Samson by Graham Dubose (United States)
 The Girl in the Red Dress by Aletta Collins (United Kingdom)

Awards

Official awards
The following films and people received the 2002 Official selection awards:
Palme d'Or: The Pianist by Roman Polanski
Grand Prix: The Man Without a Past (Mies vailla menneisyyttä) by Aki Kaurismäki
Best Director:
 Im Kwon-taek for Chi-hwa-seon
 Paul Thomas Anderson for Punch-Drunk Love
Best Screenplay: Sweet Sixteen by Paul Laverty
Best Actress: Kati Outinen for The Man Without a Past (Mies vailla menneisyyttä)
Best Actor: Olivier Gourmet for The Son (Le Fils)
Jury Prize:  Divine Intervention (Yadon ilaheyya) by Elia Suleiman
Honorary Golden Palm: Woody Allen
55th Anniversary Prize: Bowling for Columbine by Michael Moore
Un Certain Regard
Un Certain Regard Award: Blissfully Yours (Sud sanaeha) by Apichatpong Weerasethakul
Cinéfondation
 First Prize: Um Sol Alaranjado by Eduardo Valente
 Second Prize: Seule maman a les yeux bleus by Eric Forestier
 Third Prize: Questions d'un ouvrier mort by Aya Somech
Golden Camera
Caméra d'Or: Seaside (Bord de mer) by Julie Lopes-Curval
Caméra d'Or - Special Mention: Japón by Carlos Reygadas
Short Films
Short Film Palme d'Or: After Rain (Esö után) by Péter Mészáros
Short Film Jury Prize: A Very Very Silent Film by Manish Jha & The Stone of Folly by Jesse Rosensweet

1939 Palme d'Or
The inaugural Cannes Film Festival was to have been held in 1939, but was cancelled by the outbreak of the Second World War. The organizers of the 2002 festival assembled a jury of six members, including Dieter Kosslick and Alberto Barbera, to watch seven of the twelve features which had been entered in the 1939 competition, namely: Goodbye, Mr. Chips, La piste du nord, Lenin in 1918, The Four Feathers, The Wizard of Oz, Union Pacific, and Boefje. Union Pacific was retrospectively voted the winner of the 1939 Palme d'Or.

Independent awards
FIPRESCI Prizes
 The Clay Bird (Matir Moina) by Tareque Masud (Directors' Fortnight)
 Divine Intervention (Yadon ilaheyya) by Elia Suleiman (In competition)
 Waiting for Happiness (Heremakono) by Abderrahmane Sissako (Un Certain Regard)
Ecumenical Jury
 Prize of the Ecumenical Jury: The Man Without a Past (Mies vailla menneisyyttä) by Aki Kaurismäki
 Ecumenical Jury - Special Mention: 
My Mother's Smile (L'ora di religione (Il sorriso di mia madre)) by Marco Bellocchio
The Son (Le Fils) by Luc and Jean-Pierre Dardenner
Award of the Youth
Foreign Film: Morvern Callar by Lynne Ramsay
French Film: Carnages by Delphine Gleize
Awards in the frame of International Critics' Week
International Critics' Week Grand Prize: Respiro by Emanuele Crialese
Grand Golden Rail: Hypnotized and Hysterical (Hairstylist Wanted) (Filles perdues, cheveux gras) by Claude Duty
Small Golden Rail: From Mesmer, with Love or Tea for Two (De Mesmer, con amor o Té para dos) by Salvador Aguirre, Alejandro Lubezki
Canal+ Award: From Mesmer, with Love or Tea for Two (De Mesmer, con amor o Té para dos) by Salvador Aguirre, Alejandro Lubezki
Young Critics Award - Best Short: Meeting Evil (Möte med ondskan) by Reza Parsa
Young Critics Award - Best Feature: Respiro by Emanuele Crialese
Kodak Short Film Award: From Mesmer, with Love or Tea for Two (De Mesmer, con amor o Té para dos) by Salvador Aguirre, Alejandro Lubezki
Awards in the frame of Directors' Fortnight
C.I.C.A.E. Award: Morvern Callar by Lynne Ramsay
Gras Savoye Award: Mémoires incertaines by Michale Boganim
Association Prix François Chalais
François Chalais Award: Marooned in Iraq (Gomgashtei dar Aragh) by Bahman Ghobadi

References

Media
INA: Woody Allen opens the 2002 Festival (commentary in French)
INA: Closing ceremony and prize-giving of the 2002 Festival (commentary in French)

External links

2002 Cannes Film Festival (web.archive)
Official website Retrospective 2002 
2002 Cannes 2002 Awards at Internet Movie Database

Cannes Film Festival
Cannes Film Festival
Cannes Film Festival
Cannes Film Festival
Cannes Film Festival
Cannes Film Festival